Hustlin' is an album by jazz saxophonist Stanley Turrentine recorded for the Blue Note label and performed by Turrentine with Shirley Scott, Kenny Burrell, Bob Cranshaw, and Otis Finch.

Critical reception

The Allmusic review by Scott Yanow awarded the album 4 stars and states "The Turrentine-Scott team never made an unworthy disc; all are easily recommended, including this one".

Track listing

 "Trouble (No. 2)" (Harold Logan, Lloyd Price) – 7:48
 "Love Letters" (Heyman, Young) – 7:38
 "The Hustler" (Turrentine) – 6:02
 "Ladyfingers" (Shirley Scott) – 6:21
 "Something Happens to Me" (Marvin Fisher, Jack Segal) – 6:15
 "Goin' Home" (Antonín Dvořák, William Arms Fisher) – 7:02

Personnel
Stanley Turrentine – tenor saxophone
Shirley Scott – organ
Kenny Burrell – guitar
Bob Cranshaw – bass
Otis Finch – drums

Production
 Alfred Lion – producer
 Reid Miles – graphic designer
 Rudy Van Gelder – audio engineering
 Francis Wolff – photography

References

1965 albums
Stanley Turrentine albums
Blue Note Records albums
Albums produced by Alfred Lion
Albums recorded at Van Gelder Studio
Albums with cover art by Reid Miles